The Dark Is Rising is a 1973 children's fantasy novel by Susan Cooper. The second in The Dark Is Rising Sequence, the book won a Newbery Honor. It has been described as a "folkloric tale of an English boy caught in a battle between light and dark".

Plot
Will Stanton begins to have strange and magical experiences on his 11th birthday, which is at the winter solstice – a few days before Christmas. He discovers he is one of a group of an ancient magical people called the Old Ones, who are guardians and warriors for "the Light" (i.e. good), who are waging a centuries-long battle against the forces of "the Dark" (i.e. evil), whose evil power is rising. To fight back the Dark, the Old Ones need to find and reclaim four magical talismans (called "Things of Power") for the Light. The first of these is the "Circle of Signs" (a set of magical objects in the form of circles divided into four sections by a cross). Will is quested to collect all the Signs, so that the completed Circle can be used to ward off the forces of the Dark.

This book introduces Will Stanton, a protagonist in The Dark Is Rising Sequence, and features elements of British folklore that are especially associated with the Thames Valley, with Herne the Hunter making an appearance.

Reception, awards, and impact
The Dark Is Rising Sequence was an American Library Association Newbery Honor Book in 1974. Based on a 2007 online poll, the U.S. National Education Association named it one of "Teachers' Top 100 Books for Children". In 2012 it was ranked number 22 among all-time children's novels in a survey published by School Library Journal, a monthly with primarily U.S. audience.

A film version, The Seeker, was released in 2007. Critical reception to the film was very poor.

The BBC ran a radio adaption commencing in 2022, an adaption with some use of more modern idiom.

See also

References

External links

1973 children's books
English fantasy novels
Newbery Honor-winning works
Novels by Susan Cooper